Kauntrila (sometimes spelled Kuntrila) (Urdu:کونتريله) is the name of a village and union council of Gujar Khan Tehsil in Rawalpindi District, Punjab, Pakistan.
Kauntrila is a populated small town among few of old qasbas in Tehsil Gujar Khan. It is also an active union council of Gujar Khan Tehsil.

Raja Pervaiz Ashraf, who served as Prime Minister of Pakistan from 22 June 2012 until completing his designated term on 16 March 2013 has his maternal side of his family in kauntrila.

History 
Kauntrila was a large market before the independence of Pakistan in 1947, and was on the main walking route connecting Chakwal and Rawalpindi. This town has a number of pre-independence built houses, one of which is the tallest building called "Mari" means tall house in Pothohari language. This Mari was owned by a "Bakhshi Family" before independence. However, the Bakhshi Family had to leave their belongings and migrated to India after riots started in nearby villages.

Geography
It is situated in the south of Pothohar's capital Gujar Khan. Kauntrila is connected through a link road with Gujar khan - Daultala Road at Sasral and Sohawa - Chakwal Road at Dhoke Amb.

Popular Villages 
The popular villages that fall in kauntrila town are " Dhoke Rajgan, Mohra Mari, Mohra Jharian, Mohra Kalyal, Kolian Hameed, Kharali, Garmala, Hafial, Mohri Rajgan" etc.

Development
Kauntrila is connected through a link road with Gujar khan - Daultala Road at Sasral and Sohawa - Chakwal Road at Dhoke Amb. There is one Girls High School and one Boys Higher Secondary School. One Rural Health Centre is also working here.
Play Grounds of Boys Higher Secondary School are the biggest in Rawalpindi District, so is a favourite place for District Games. Like many other places Kauntrila also suffers with lack of medical facilities.

References

Populated places in Gujar Khan Tehsil
Union councils of Gujar Khan Tehsil